Labyrinth under Vegetable Market is a system of underground corridors and cellars in the historical centre of the city of Brno, in the Czech Republic. The underground lies beneath Zelný trh, one of oldest squares in the city, and originally served for food keeping, beer brewing, maturing of wine in barrels, and other things. Some cellars were founded in the Middle Ages, but most of them dates back to the baroque era. The cellars were not all connected together until 2009 when they underwent a major reconstruction, and since 2011 they are opened public.

References

External links 
 Official website
 

Buildings and structures in Brno
Tourist attractions in Brno